Karl Ove Knausgård (born 6 December 1968) is a Norwegian author. He became known worldwide for six autobiographical novels, titled My Struggle (Min Kamp).

Since the completion of the My Struggle series in 2011, he has also published an autobiographical series entitled The Seasons Quartet, as well as critical work on the art of Edvard Munch. He has won the 2009 Brage Prize, 2017 Jerusalem Prize, and 2019 Swedish Academy Nordic Prize.

Biography 
Born in Oslo, Knausgård was raised on Tromøya in Arendal and in Kristiansand, and studied arts and literature at the University of Bergen. He then held various jobs, including teaching high school in northern Norway, selling cassettes, working in a psychiatric hospital  and on an oil platform, while trying to become a writer. He eventually moved to Stockholm and published his first novel in 1998.

Literary career

Debut and follow-up
Knausgård made his publishing debut in 1998 with the novel Out of the World, for which he was awarded the Norwegian Critics Prize for Literature. This was the first time in the award's history that a debut novel had won.

His second novel, A Time for Everything (2004), partly retells certain parts of the Bible as well as the history of angels on earth. The book won a number of awards, and was nominated for the Nordic Council's Literature Prize. It was also nominated for the International Dublin Literary Award. It was called a "strange, uneven, and marvelous book" by The New York Review of Books.

The Min Kamp books 
While Knausgård's two first books were well received, it was the six-volume Min Kamp series of autobiographical novels that made Knausgård a household name in Norway. Published from 2009 to 2011 and totaling over 3,500 pages, the books were hugely successful and also caused much controversy. The controversy was caused partly because the Norwegian title of the book, Min Kamp, is the same as the Norwegian title of Hitler's Mein Kampf, and partly because some have suggested Knausgård goes too far in exposing the private lives of his friends and family—including his father, ex-wife, uncle, and grandmother. The books have nevertheless received almost universally favorable reviews, at least the first two volumes. In a country of five million people, the Min Kamp series has sold over 450,000 copies.

The Min Kamp series is translated into numerous languages. The books were published to great critical acclaim in Denmark, Sweden, and several other countries. All six have been translated into English by Don Bartlett for publication by Archipelago Books (US) and Harvill Secker (UK), and have been retitled in Britain as A Death in the Family, A Man in Love, Boyhood Island, Dancing in the Dark, Some Rain Must Fall, and The End (The End translated by Bartlett and Martin Aitken). The audiobooks of the English translations were recorded by Edoardo Ballerini.

In a long and largely positive review of the first Min Kamp books, James Wood of The New Yorker wrote that "There is something ceaselessly compelling about Knausgård's book: even when I was bored, I was interested."

Later works
Knausgård served as a consultant to the new Norwegian translation of the Bible. In 2013, he published a collection of essays, Sjelens Amerika: tekster 1996–2013 (""), and as of September 2013 he is adapting his novel Out of the World into a screenplay.

Between 2015 and 2016, Knausgaard published his Seasons Quartet, a series of four books entitled Autumn, Winter, Spring, and Summer. These books are also autobiographical in nature, consisting of diary excerpts, letters, and other personal materials. These books were released in English between 2017 and 2018.

Knausgaard has also written works devoted to the visual arts. He co-authored Anselm Kiefer: Transition from Cool to Warm, a book in 2018 on the German artist Anselm Kiefer with James Lawrence. In 2019, Knausgaard published a monograph on the Norwegian artist Edvard Munch, and his interview about Munch also appeared as a highlight of the British Museum's 2019 exhibition catalog, Edvard Munch: Love and Angst, by curator Giulia Bartrum.

In October 2019 Knausgård became the sixth writer chosen to contribute to the Future Library project.

Knausgård's essay collection, In the Land of the Cyclops (2018), was first published in English in January 2021.

In September 2020 Knausgård's novel Morgenstjernen ("The Morning Star") was published to critical acclaim in Norway. Danish and Swedish translations were published a few months later to great critical acclaim.
It was sold in advance to fifteen countries.

In 2021 Ulvene fra evighetens skog, a sequel to Morgenstjernen,  was published in Norway. A third book in the Morgenstjernen-series with the title Det tredje riket followed in 2022.

Critical reception
Following the publication of Min kamp, Knausgård has been described as "one of the 21st century's greatest literary sensations" by the Wall Street Journal. Some consider him the greatest Norwegian writer since playwright Henrik Ibsen. His deliberately prolix and minutely detailed style drew comparison to that of French novelist Marcel Proust and his seven-volume novel In Search of Lost Time.

Knausgård's 2020 novel The Morning Star was a critical success in Scandinavia. While reviewers of the English translation of the novel were more ambivalent, Knausgård was acknowledged as "one of the finest writers alive" by Dwight Garner in New York Times and "a writer of supreme interest" by Charles Arrowsmith in Los Angeles Times.

Editing career 
Between 1999 and 2002 Knausgård was co-editor of Vagant, a Norwegian literary magazine founded in 1988. He was part of the first editorial team of Vagant in Bergen; until 1999 the magazine had been based in Oslo. Knausgård contributed essays about the writings of Don DeLillo and The Divine Comedy by Dante. He also conducted in-depth interviews with the Norwegian writers Rune Christiansen and Thure Erik Lund for the magazine. Just after he left Vagant and Bergen, his former co-editor Preben Jordal wrote a very negative review of Knausgård's second novel in the magazine, with the title «Mellom Bibel og babbel» ("Between the Bible and babble")—an episode discussed in the second volume of Min Kamp.

Publishing career 
In 2010, he founded a small, eclectic publishing house, Pelikanen (Pelican), with his brother Yngve Knausgård and Asbjørn Jensen. Pelikanen has so far published Denis Johnson, Peter Handke, Christian Kracht, Ben Marcus, Curzio Malaparte and Stig Larsson in Norwegian translations.

Personal life
Knausgård is currently married to his third wife, Michal Shavit. Shavit is the publishing director of Jonathan Cape in London, and previously worked as editorial director of Harvill Secker, where she edited and published Knausgård's novels. Shavit and Knausgård have one child, and live together in London, along with their children from prior marriages. 

Knausgård lived in Österlen, Sweden, with his second wife, the writer Linda Boström Knausgård, and their four children until November 2016 when he and his wife separated.
He now lives between London and Sweden.

In a radio interview with his estranged first wife, Tonje Aursland, who plays a part in several of the Min Kamp books, Knausgård admitted that he sometimes feels that he has made a "Faustian bargain"—that he has achieved huge success by sacrificing his relationships with friends and members of his family. In October 2010, Aursland presented her perspective on involuntarily becoming a subject of her ex-husband's autobiography in a radio documentary broadcast on NRK. Knausgård's uncle, who is represented as Gunnar in the Min Kamp books, has been highly critical of the whole project in the Norwegian press.

Bibliography
 1998: Ute av verden, Tiden Norsk Forlag, 1998, 
 Out of the World, Archipelago, 2024, translated by Martin Aitken, 
 2004: En tid for alt, Oktober 
A Time for Everything 2004
 2009–2011: My Struggle (Min Kamp), six volumes
A Death in the Family. My Struggle 1, Penguin
A Man in Love. My Struggle 2, Penguin
Boyhood Island. My Struggle 3, Penguin
Dancing in the Dark. My Struggle 4, Penguin
Some Rain Must Fall. My Struggle 5, Penguin
The End. My Struggle 6, Penguin  
 Sjelens Amerika, Oktober, 2013, 
 2014: Nakker
Necks Photographs by Thomas Wagstrom, Max Strom, Bokforlaget, 2015, 
 2015–2016: Årstid encyklopedien (Seasonal Encyclopedia)
 Om høsten (Autumn), 2015, Illustrated by Vanessa Baird, 
 Autumn, Penguin, 2017, 
 Om vinteren (Winter), 2015 Illustrated by Lars Lerin, 
 Winter, Penguin, 2018, 
 Om våren (Spring), 2016, Illustrated by Anna Bjerger, 
 Spring, Penguin, 2018, 
 Om sommeren (Summer), 2016, Illustrated by Anselm Kiefer, 
 Summer, Penguin, 2018, 
 2015: Hjemme – Borte With Fredrik Ekelund
 Home and Away: Writing the Beautiful Game, 2017 (English translation), with Fredrik Ekelund, translated by Don Bartlett and Sean Kinsella, 
2018: Anselm Kiefer: Transition from Cool to Warm with James Lawrence, 
 2019: So Much Longing in So Little Space: The Art of Edvard Munch, 
 2020: Morgenstjernen, Oktober 
 The Morning Star, Penguin, 2021, translated by Martin Aitken, 
 2021: Ulvene fra evighetens skog, Oktober 
 The Wolves of Eternity, Penguin, 2023, translated by Martin Aitken, 
 2022: Det tredje riket, Oktober

Articles in English
 2015: 
 2020:

Awards and nominations

Nominations
Nominated for the 2004 Nordic Council's Literature Prize

Awards
1998 Norwegian Critics Prize for Literature
2009 Brage Prize
2009 NRK P2 Listeners' Prize
2010 Book of the Year Prize in Morgenbladet
2015 Welt-Literaturpreis
2017 Jerusalem Prize
2019 Swedish Academy Nordic Prize
See full list of Awards and honours of My Struggle

References

External links

Karl Ove Knausgård at Aschehoug Agency
Karl Ove Knausgård at Forlaget Oktober
Karl Ove Knausgård Proust Questionnaire at Portobello Books
Karl Ove Knausgård Bibliography

 (Audio)
 (Audio)
Karl Ove Knausgård interview in English for Canada's CBC radio
Karl My First Time Paris Review interview

Reviews
Ben Lerner on Knausgård in London Review of Books
"My Struggle vol. 1" in Politiken (Danish)
"My Struggle vol. 2" in Politiken (Danish)
"My Struggle vol. 1–4" in Göteborgs-Posten (Swedish)
"My Struggle vol. 1" in Dagbladet Information (Danish)
"A Time to Every Purpose Under Heaven" in The Independent

1968 births
Living people
20th-century Norwegian novelists
21st-century Norwegian novelists
The New Yorker people
Norwegian Critics Prize for Literature winners
Norwegian expatriates in Sweden
People from Arendal
University of Bergen alumni
Prix Médicis essai winners
Controversies in Sweden